Gerard Mackworth Young CIE (1884–1965) was director of the British School at Athens from 1936 to 1946.

He was the eldest of four sons of Sir William Mackworth Young (1840–1924), KCSI, JP, of the Indian Civil Service, who was Lieutenant-Governor of the Punjab from 1897 to 1902, and his second wife Frances Mary, daughter of Sir Robert Eyles Egerton, KCSI, JP, Lieutenant-Governor of the Punjab from 1877 to 1882. Sir Robert Egerton was nephew of the 8th and 9th Grey Egerton baronets. Gerard's paternal grandfather was Sir George Young, 2nd Baronet; the name 'Mackworth' came from his paternal grandmother, Susan, daughter of William Mackworth-Praed, Serjeant-at-law, of that gentry family of Mickleham, Surrey.

Gerard Mackworth Young assumed the surname of Mackworth-Young by deed poll in 1947. In 1916, he married Natalie Leila Margaret, daughter of Rt Hon Sir Walter Francis Hely Hutchinson, GCMG, Governor-General and Commander-in-Chief, Cape of Good Hope from 1901 to 1910, son of the 4th Earl of Donoughmore. The elder of their two sons (there being also two daughters) was the royal librarian Sir Robin Mackworth-Young.

His brothers Sir Hubert Winthrop Young, KCMG and Sir Mark Aitchison Young, GCMG were also colonial administrators.

References 

1884 births
1965 deaths
Directors of the British School at Athens